Patching is a surname. Notable people with the surname include:

George Patching (1886–1944), South African sprinter
Glenn Patching (born 1958), Australian swimmer
Julius Patching (1917–2009), Australian sports administrator
Martin Patching (born 1958), English footballer
Thomas Patching, (fl. 1386–1408) English politician
Will Patching (1998), English footballer